







Lists of country codes